The 1916 North Fermanagh by-election was held on 27 October 1916.  The by-election was held due to the resignation of the incumbent Irish Unionist MP, Godfrey Fetherstonhaugh.  It was won by the Irish Unionist candidate Edward Archdale who was unopposed due to a War-time electoral pact.

References

1916 elections in Ireland
1916 elections in the United Kingdom
By-elections to the Parliament of the United Kingdom in County Fermanagh constituencies
Unopposed by-elections to the Parliament of the United Kingdom (need citation)
20th century in County Fermanagh
October 1916 events